Gridlock'd is a 1997 American black comedy crime film written and directed by Vondie Curtis-Hall and starring Tupac Shakur, Tim Roth, Lucy Liu, and Thandiwe Newton. It was the directorial debut of Curtis-Hall, who also has a small role in the film. The film's opening was relatively low, despite critical acclaim; its opening weekend netted only $2,678,372 and it finished with a little over $5.5 million.

The film paid tribute to star Tupac Shakur, who was murdered four months prior to the film's release.

Plot
Set in Detroit, Gridlock'd centers around heroin addicts Spoon, Stretch and Cookie. They are in a band – in the spoken word genre – called Eight Mile Road, with Cookie on lead vocals, Spoon on bass guitar and Stretch on piano. Spoon and Stretch decide to kick their habit after Cookie overdoses on her first hit. Throughout a disastrous day, the two addicts dodge police and local criminals while struggling with an apathetic government bureaucracy that thwarts their entrance to a drug rehabilitation program.

Background

Production

Cast

In addition, Bokeem Woodbine appears repeatedlythough uncreditedas drug dealer Mud, while D Reper is played by the film's writer and director, Vondie Curtis-Hall; Curtis-Hall's wife and then-baby, Kasi Lemmons and Henry Hunter Hall, appear briefly as the Madonna and Child.

Soundtrack

Reception

Critical response 

The New York Times editor Janet Maslin praised Shakur's performance: "He played this part with an appealing mix of presence, confidence and humor". Desson Howe, for the Washington Post, wrote, "Shakur and Roth, who seem born for these roles, are allowed to take charge – and have fun doing it". USA Today gave the film three out of four stars and felt that Hall had not "latched onto a particularly original notion of city blight. But he knows how to mine the humor in such desperation". Similarly, Roger Ebert wrote in the Chicago Sun-Times that Roth and Shakur "illuminate" a "movie of despair and desperation" with "gritty, goofy comic spirit". He gave the film three out of four stars and said, "This is grim material, but surprisingly entertaining, and it is more cause to mourn the recent death of Shakur, who gives his best performance".

Entertainment Weekly gave the film a "B" rating and Owen Gleiberman wrote, "Gridlock'd doesn't have the imaginative vision of a movie like Trainspotting, yet it's more literally true to the haphazard torpor of the junkie life than anything we've seen on screen since Drugstore Cowboy ... Curtis-Hall has caught the bottom-feeder enervation of heroin addiction."

Box office
Gridlock'd was released January 31, 1997, finishing at #10 at the box office in the United States and Canada for its opening weekend, and went on to a total gross of $5.6million during its domestic run. The film was released in the United Kingdom on May 30, 1997.

References

External links
 
 

1997 films
1990s black comedy films
1990s buddy comedy films
1990s crime comedy-drama films
1997 independent films
American black comedy films
American buddy comedy films
American crime comedy-drama films
American independent films
Films scored by Stewart Copeland
Films about drugs
Films about heroin addiction
Films directed by Vondie Curtis-Hall
Films set in Detroit
Films shot in Los Angeles
Gramercy Pictures films
Hood films
Interscope Communications films
PolyGram Filmed Entertainment films
Universal Pictures films
1997 directorial debut films
1990s English-language films
1990s American films